Juan de la Cruz Benavente (1818 –  27 March 1876) was a Bolivian lawyer and politician who served as minister of government and foreign affairs from 1862 to 1863. He previously served as minister of public instruction and foreign affairs from 1854 to 1857. In 1863, he was named Bolivia's Minister Plenipotentiary in Peru, and was charged with the negotiations that led to the signing of the Treaty of Defensive Alliance with Peru on February 6, 1873.

Bibliography 
 Cayo Córdova, Percy: El entorno internacional y la política exterior en el periodo 1870–1876. Tercera parte de Historia Marítima del Perú. La República – 1870 a 1876 (Tomo IX, Volumen 1). Instituto de Estudios Históricos Marítimos del Perú. Lima-Perú, 1993.
 Basadre Grohmann, Jorge: Historia de la República del Perú (1822–1933), 18 tomos. Editada por la Empresa Editora El Comercio S. A. Lima, 2005.  Edición digital: Perú Quiosco

External links

1818 births
1876 deaths
19th-century Bolivian lawyers
19th-century Bolivian politicians
Achá administration cabinet members
Ambassadors of Bolivia to Peru
Belzu administration cabinet members
Bolivian diplomats
Córdova administration cabinet members
Education ministers of Bolivia
Foreign ministers of Bolivia
Interior ministers of Bolivia
Justice ministers of Bolivia